QUaD, an acronym for QUEST at DASI, was a ground-based cosmic microwave background (CMB) polarization experiment at the South Pole. QUEST (Q and U Extragalactic Sub-mm Telescope) was the original name attributed to the bolometer detector instrument, while DASI is a famous CMB interferometry experiment credited with the first detection of CMB polarization. QUaD used the existing DASI mechanical infrastructure but replaced the DASI interferometric array with a bolometer detector at the end of a cassegrain optical system. The mount has housed the Keck Array since 2011.

See also 

 Cosmic microwave background radiation
 Cosmic microwave background experiments

References

External links
 http://www.stanford.edu/~schurch/quad.html
 http://find.spa.umn.edu/quad/

Submillimetre telescopes
Radio telescopes
Cosmic microwave background experiments
 Astronomical experiments in the Antarctic